Yao Li-ming (born 15 January 1952) is a Taiwanese political scientist, politician, and political commentator.

Life and career
Yao is of Mainland Chinese descent. He attended the Affiliated Senior High School of National Taiwan Normal University before studying law at Fu Jen Catholic University, and subsequently earned a doctorate in the subject at Bielefeld University. Prior to serving in the Third Legislative Yuan, Yao hosted a political talk show for the Public Television Service and was an adjunct instructor at National Sun Yat-sen University. He represented Kaohsiung County in the Legislative Yuan from 1996 to 1999. After Yao withdrew from the New Party during his legislative term, he remained in office as a political independent. Subsequently, Lin joined the Chinese Culture University faculty as a political scientist and professor of administrative management. Aside from academia, Yao resumed his media career as a political commentator. Later, Yao served as secretary-general of the Home Party, and was ranked second on the Home Party party list for the January 2008 legislative elections, but was not elected to the Legislative Yuan. He was also on the board of the Congress Watch Foundation. He later became chairman of the Congress Watch Foundation. Yao and former legislative colleague  led a commemoration of the 1989 Tiananmen Square protests and massacre held at Chiang Kai-shek Memorial Hall in June 2009. Yao was a founding board member of the Thinking Taiwan Foundation, established by Tsai Ing-wen in 2012. Independent mayoral candidate Ko Wen-je offered Yao the position of campaign director before the 2014 Taipei mayoral election, which Yao accepted. In his role as campaign manager, Yao filed a lawsuit against  for defamation, as Lo had claimed that Ko was involved in corruption, tax evasion, and money laundering while working as a physician at National Taiwan University Hospital. Ko's campaign later alleged that opposing candidate Sean Lien's campaign had wiretapped Ko's campaign office. In response, Lien's campaign manager Alex Tsai filed a lawsuit against Yao and other members of Ko's campaign staff. After Ko won the Taipei mayoralty, Yao again returned to political commentary. Yao later appeared alongside Ko in a February 2015 rally organized to support . Prior to the 2018 Taipei City Council election, Yao opined that there were many swing voters in Taipei, negating the city as a Kuomintang stronghold. Yao Li-ming split with Ko, and offered his support and services as a campaign manager to Pasuya Yao instead.

References

1952 births
Living people
Members of the 3rd Legislative Yuan
New Party Members of the Legislative Yuan
Fu Jen Catholic University alumni
Academic staff of the Chinese Culture University
Taiwanese expatriates in Germany
Bielefeld University alumni
Taiwanese political scientists
political commentators